Uncites is an extinct genus of brachiopods in the family Uncitidae. This genus includes spire-bearing brachiopod with a rostrate ventral valve. A typical species is Uncites gryphus from the Middle Devonian in Germany.

References 

 Paleobiology Database
 R. T. Becker,W. T. Kirchgasser  Devonian Events and Correlations
 Thomas Davidson  British Fossil Brachiopoda
 The Century Dictionary and Cyclopedia

Prehistoric brachiopod genera
Rhynchonellata